This is a select list of cottages in Dorset.

Anvil Cottage and Cob Cottage, Chideock
Butts Cottage, Piddletrenthide
Clouds Hill
Dale Cottage, Milton Abbas
Dorset Cottage and Mere wood Cottage, Tarrant Rushton
Cross Cottage, Glynn Cottage and Wistaria Cottage, Bradford Abbas
Iles Cottages, Leigh
Leeson Cottage, Swanage
Martyrs' Cottages
May Cottage, Okeford Fitzpaine
Nicky House Cottage, Witchampton and another
Old Came Rectory 
Pope's Cottage, Corscombe
River Cottage 
Rolls Cottage, Iwerne Minster
Thomas Hardy's Cottage 
Turnpike Cottage, Wimborne Minster
Wessex Cottage, Osmington
Woolgarston Cottage, Corfe Castle

References
Lawrence Weaver. The "Country Life" Book of Cottages. Country Life. 1919. Pages 55 ("Concrete and Thatch in Dorset"), 86 ("Dorset Plan with Dormers"), 88 ("Concrete Cottages in Dorset"), 151 ("Dorset Cottage in Concrete and Thatch"), 232, 233 (In Iwerne Minster Village"), 262 ("A New Hamlet in Dorset". See also passim. Google Books. 1913. Internet Archive.

Cottages